Aqeh Kheyl (also Romanized as ‘Aqeh Kheyl; also known as Naqīb Kheyl, Naqīb Kheyl Sa‘īdābād, Naqīb Khīl Sa‘īdābād, and Sa’īd Ābād) is a village in Chahardangeh Rural District, Chahardangeh District, Sari County, Mazandaran Province, Iran. At the 2006 census, its population was 65, in 21 families.

References 

Populated places in Sari County